Sejs-Svejbæk is a railway town, with a population of 4,581 (1 January 2022). It is located in Silkeborg Municipality, Central Jutland Region in Denmark, 7 km southeast of Silkeborg.

Sejs-Svejbæk is served by Svejbæk station, located on the Skanderborg-Skjern railway line.

Sejs-Svejbæk Church

Sejs-Svejbæk Church, whose floor plan is modelled on a Roman bacilica with chancel, nave and aisles, was inaugurated in 1989.

Notable people

 Lars Larsen, businessman, founder of Jysk, lived in Sejs-Svejbæk from 1982 until his death
 Esben Bjerre Hansen, radio and television personality

References

Cities and towns in the Central Denmark Region
Silkeborg Municipality